Bishop of Port Pirie may refer to:

 Anglican Bishop of Willochra
 Bishop of the Roman Catholic Diocese of Port Pirie